The Birmingham Coal Company was a coal mining company in the Pittsburgh Coalfield area. It operated mines along Becks Run,
as well as other mines south of the Monongahela River, such as the Bausman Mine and the American Mine.  It is named for Birmingham, Pennsylvania, a town which was later annexed to Pittsburgh.  Part of the company was the Birmingham Coal Company Railroad, a  narrow gauge railroad that ran Along 21st street.  Coal was transferred underground using a tailrope system from Spiketown to the mine entrance, and from there to the railroad on a gravity plane to the railroad.

References

Coal companies of the United States
Mining in Pennsylvania
Defunct mining companies of the United States
Defunct companies based in Pennsylvania
History of Allegheny County, Pennsylvania
History of Pittsburgh
Defunct Pennsylvania railroads
Narrow gauge railroads in Pennsylvania
3 ft 2 in gauge railways in the United States
Transportation in Pittsburgh
Defunct coal mining companies